Jayanca District is one of twelve districts of the Lambayeque Province in the Lambayeque region, Peru.

History 
The district's origin is unclear, however in his book Misceláneas Australes Enrique Brünning reports that the valley was settled by Llapchillully, the favored tailor of Naylamp, the mythical founder of Lambayeque. American anthropologist Izumi Shimada has claimed that the district's first inhabitants, the Sarayoq, belonged to the Andean civilization known as Chavín de Huántar, who formed their first rural settlements in the fertile valleys of Jayanca, Salas, and Motupe.

During the Incan period Jayanca was subdued by the Inca Huayna Capac who, commanding 40,000 men, left Cusco and headed for Quito. During his voyage, he conquered several valleys of the north coast, among them Jayanca.

References

External links
  Official district web site